Funkify Your Life: The Meters Anthology is a compilation album by the funk group The Meters. The album was released in 1995 by Rhino Records. It is a comprehensive compilation of the band's work.

Background
Disc one is a compilation of work released under Josie Records from 1969 to 1972. It includes 19 songs from the band's first three albums, arranged chronologically, followed by 7 songs released as singles. It starts off with instrumental tracks and vocal tracks appear later. In 1972 the band signed with Reprise Records, a subsidiary of Warner Bros. Records. Disk two, also arranged chronologically, is a compilation of 17 songs from the band's five albums under Reprise from 1972 to 1977. Most tracks feature vocals and tracks 8 through 17 include Cyril Neville as a band member.

The Meters disbanded in 1979. There have been several reincarnations and reunions including a 2015 performance at the New Orleans Jazz Festival, however, there were no studio album releases under the original band name after 1977. According to AllMusic, Funkify Your Life was "the first truly comprehensive and widely available" compilation of the band's work.

Reception

Steve Huey of AllMusic wrote, what sets the music apart is the delivery of melody through single-note guitar lines and drummer Modeliste's "dominating" performance. He gave the album a five star rating and added "for devoted funk fans, Funkify Your Life should be considered essential listening." In his reviews, Robert Christgau also noted Modeliste's "eccentric" articulation. He called the band "totally original" and said the music is "sometimes too minimal, and not devoid of dead spots. But seminal and essential – and fun." He placed the album on his top six New Orleans classics list.

Track listing

Personnel
Credits adapted from AllMusic, with added primary artist vocal credits, and added 'select tracks' notation.

Primary artist
Art Neville – keyboards, vocals, composer, producer
Leo Nocentelli – guitar, composer, producer, background vocals
Ziggy Modeliste – drums, vocals, composer, producer
George Porter Jr. – bass, composer, producer, background vocals
Disc 2
Cyril Neville – congas, percussion, vocals, producer, composer (Disc 2, tracks 8, 9, 15, 16)

Production
Allen Toussaint – producer, composer (Disc 1, track 19) 
Marshall Sehorn – producer
David Rubinson – producer (Disc 2, tracks 15, 16, 17)

Additional performance
Tony Owens – background vocals (select tracks)
Terry Smith – background vocals (select tracks)
Squirrel – congas (select tracks)

Additional composition
Buddy Buie – composer (Disc 1, track 6)
James Cobb – composer (Disc 1, track 6)
Steve Cropper – composer (Disc 2, track 17)
Roquel Davis – composer (Disc 1, track 17)
Dominic Frontiere – composer (Disc 2, track 14)
Earl King – composer, guest artist, unknown contributor role, vocals (Disc 2, track 13)
Carl Marsh – composer (Disc 2, track 17)
Maurice McAlister – composer (Disc 1, track 17)
Naomi Neville (alias for Allen Toussaint) – composer (Disc 1, track 19)
Jimmy Tarbutton – composer (Disc 2, track 17)
Vincent Toussaint – composer (Disc 1, track 24, Disc 2, track 12)
Wardell Quezergue – arranger, horn arrangements (select tracks)

Compilation production
James Austin – compilation producer
Don Snowden – compilation producer, liner notes
A. Scott Galloway – liner notes
Bob Fisher – tape research
Bill Inglot – remastering
Ken Perry – remastering
Ted Myers – project assistant
Sevie Bates – design
Coco Shinomiya – artwork
Michael P. Smith – photography
Gary Peterson – discographical annotation

References

1995 compilation albums
The Meters albums
Rhino Records compilation albums